Telephones - main lines in use:
22,000 (1995)

Telephones - mobile cellular:
35,000 (2004) est.

Telephone system:
good international communications; good domestic facilities
domestic:
digitalization was to have been completed in 1998
international:
satellite earth stations - 1 Orion; 2 fiber-optic submarine cable linking the Faroe Islands with Denmark, Iceland and Scotland

Radio broadcast stations:
AM 1, FM 13, shortwave 0 (1998)

Radios:
26,000 (1997)

Television broadcast stations:
7 (plus 51 low-power repeaters) (September 1995)

Televisions:
15,000 (1997)

Internet Service Providers (ISPs):
DataNet 
El & Tele 
Føroya Tele 
Hey 
Teletech 

Country code (TLD): FO

References

 

he:תקשורת באיי פארו